Chhattisgarh State Men's Football  League Championship is the top state-level football league in the Indian state of Chhattisgarh. It is organised by Chhattisgarh Football Association (CGFA).

The inaugural season kicked off on 29 March 2022 with 8 teams competing for the maiden title.

Format and regulations 

A total of 8 teams compete in the league. Each team can sign a maximum of 4 players outside the state of Chhattisgarh. A maximum of 2 foreign players are allowed per squad.

Teams

See also 
 Chhattisgarh Football Association

References 

Football leagues in India
Football in Chhattisgarh
Sports leagues established in 2022